General elections were held in the Pitcairn Islands on 26 December 1971 to elect members of the Island Council. Of the island's 91 residents, 61 were registered to vote. Voting was compulsory, with a $1 fine for failing to cast a ballot.

Results
Elected members included Gifford Christian and Ivan Christian.

References

1971 elections in Oceania
1971 in the Pitcairn Islands
Elections in the Pitcairn Islands